Arenal is a municipality in the Honduran department of Yoro.

Demographics
At the time of the 2013 Honduras census, Arenal municipality had a population of 5,949. Of these, 99.51% were Mestizo, 0.24% Black or Afro-Honduran, 0.22% Indigenous and 0.03% White.

References

Municipalities of the Yoro Department